The 2011–12 network television schedule for the five major English-language commercial broadcast networks in the United States covers prime time hours from September 2011 through August 2012. The schedule is followed by a list per network of returning series, new series, and series canceled after the 2010–11 season.

NBC was the first to announce their fall schedule on May 15, 2011, followed by Fox on May 16, ABC on May 17, CBS on May 18 and The CW on May 19.

The CW was the first to announce their midseason schedule on November 2, 2011, followed by CBS and NBC on November 14, 2011, ABC on November 18, 2011 and Fox on December 1, 2011.

PBS is not included; member stations have local flexibility over most of their schedules and broadcast times for network shows may vary. MyNetworkTV is also not included since its programming comprises syndicated reruns. The CW is not included on weekends, when it does not offer network programming. Ion Television primarily airs syndicated reruns (similar to MyNetworkTV), along with new episodes of Flashpoint.

New series are highlighted in bold.

All times are U.S. Eastern Time and Pacific Time (except for some live sports or events). Subtract one hour for Central and Mountain times.

From July 27 to August 12, 2012 all of NBC's primetime programming was preempted in favor of coverage of the 2012 Summer Olympics in London.

Each of the 30 highest-rated shows is listed with its rank and rating as determined by Nielsen Media Research.

Legend

Sunday

Monday

Tuesday

Wednesday

Thursday

Friday

Saturday

By network

ABC

Returning series
20/20
ABC Saturday Movie of the Week
America's Funniest Home Videos
The Bachelor
Bachelor Pad
The Bachelorette
Body of Proof
Castle
Cougar Town
Dancing with the Stars
Desperate Housewives
Extreme Makeover: Home Edition
Grey's Anatomy
Happy Endings
The Middle
Modern Family
Primetime
Primetime: What Would You Do?
Private Practice
Saturday Night Football
Shark Tank
Wife Swap
Wipeout

New series
Charlie's Angels
Don't Trust the B---- in Apartment 23 *
Duets *
Final Witness *
GCB *
The Glass House *
Last Man Standing
Man Up!
Missing *
NY Med *
Once Upon a Time
Pan Am
Revenge
The River *
Scandal *
Suburgatory
Trust Us with Your Life *
Work It *
You Deserve It

Not returning from 2010–11:
101 Ways to Leave a Game Show
Better with You
Brothers & Sisters
Combat Hospital
Detroit 1-8-7
Expedition Impossible
Jamie Oliver's Food Revolution
Mr. Sunshine
My Generation
No Ordinary Family
Off the Map
Skating with the Stars
Supernanny
Take the Money and Run
V
The Whole Truth

CBS

Returning series
48 Hours
60 Minutes
The Amazing Race
The Big Bang Theory
Blue Bloods
Criminal Minds
CSI: Crime Scene Investigation
CSI: Miami
CSI: NY
The Good Wife
Hawaii Five-0
How I Met Your Mother
The Mentalist
Mike & Molly
NCIS
NCIS: Los Angeles
Rules of Engagement
Survivor
Two and a Half Men
Undercover Boss

New series
2 Broke Girls
3 *
Dogs in the City *
A Gifted Man
How to Be a Gentleman
NYC 22 *
Person of Interest
¡Rob! *
Unforgettable

Not returning from 2010–11:
$#*! My Dad Says
CHAOS
Criminal Minds: Suspect Behavior
The Defenders
Flashpoint (moved to Ion Television)
Live to Dance
Mad Love
Medium

The CW

Returning series
90210
America's Next Top Model
Gossip Girl
Nikita
One Tree Hill
Supernatural
The Vampire Diaries
Racing Track

New series
Breaking Pointe *
The Catalina *
H8R
Hart of Dixie
The L.A. Complex *
The Next: Fame Is at Your Doorstep *
Oh Sit! *
Remodeled *
Ringer
The Secret Circle

Not returning from 2010–11:
Hellcats
Life Unexpected
Shedding for the Wedding
Smallville

Fox

Returning series
American Dad!
American Idol
Bob's Burgers
Bones
Breaking In
The Cleveland Show
COPS
Family Guy
Fringe
Glee
Hell's Kitchen
House
Kitchen Nightmares
MasterChef
Mobbed
NFL on Fox
Raising Hope
The Simpsons
So You Think You Can Dance

New series
Alcatraz *
Allen Gregory *
Baseball Night in America *
The Choice *
The Finder *
I Hate My Teenage Daughter
Napoleon Dynamite *
New Girl
Q'Viva! The Chosen *
Take Me Out *
Terra Nova
Touch *
The X Factor

Not returning from 2010–11:
America's Most Wanted (moved to Lifetime; returned to Fox in 2020–21)
The Chicago Code
The Good Guys
Human Target
Lie to Me
Lone Star
Million Dollar Money Drop
Running Wilde (burned off on FX)
Traffic Light

NBC

Returning series
30 Rock
The Apprentice
The Biggest Loser
Chuck
Community
Dateline NBC
Fear Factor
Mi corazón insiste en Lola Volcán
Football Night in America
Harry's Law
Law & Order: Special Victims Unit
Love in the Wild
NBC Sunday Night Football
The Office
Parenthood
Parks and Recreation
The Sing-Off
The Voice
Who Do You Think You Are?

New series
Are You There, Chelsea? *
Awake *
Bent *
Best Friends Forever *
Betty White's Off Their Rockers *
Escape Routes *
Fashion Star *
The Firm *
Free Agents
Grimm
Maid in Manhattan
The Playboy Club
Prime Suspect
Rock Center with Brian Williams
Smash *
Stars Earn Stripes *
Up All Night
Whitney
Who's Still Standing?

Not returning from 2010–11:
America's Next Great Restaurant
The Cape (burned off on NBC.com)
Chase
The Event
Law & Order: LA
Outlaw
Outsourced
The Paul Reiser Show
Perfect Couples
School Pride
Undercovers

Renewals and cancellations

Full season pickups

ABC
Happy Endings—Picked up for a full season on November 3, 2011.
Last Man Standing—Picked up for a full season on November 3, 2011.
Once Upon a Time—Picked up for a full season on November 3, 2011.
Revenge—Picked up for a full season on October 13, 2011.
Shark Tank—Picked up two additional episodes, totaling to 15 episodes on February 28, 2012.
Suburgatory—Picked up for a full season on October 13, 2011.

CBS
2 Broke Girls—Picked up for a full season on October 5, 2011.
Person of Interest—Picked up for a full season on October 25, 2011.
Unforgettable—Picked up for a full season on October 25, 2011.

The CW
Hart of Dixie—Picked up for a full season on October 12, 2011.
Ringer—Picked up for a full season on October 12, 2011.
The Secret Circle—Picked up for a full season on October 12, 2011.

Fox
New Girl—Picked up for 24 episodes on September 28, 2011.

NBC
Grimm—Picked up for a full season on November 21, 2011.
Harry's Law—Picked up for a full season on January 6, 2012.
Up All Night—Picked up for a full season on October 4, 2011, plus an additional 2 episodes on November 21, 2011.
Whitney—Picked up for a full season on October 4, 2011.

Renewals

ABC
20/20—Announced on the 2012/13 schedule for a thirty-fifth season on May 15, 2012.
America's Funniest Home Videos—Picked up for a twenty-third season on May 11, 2012.
The Bachelor—Picked up for a seventeenth cycle on May 10, 2012.
Body of Proof—Picked up for a third season on May 11, 2012.
Castle—Picked up for a fifth season on May 10, 2012.
Dancing with the Stars—Picked up for a fifteenth cycle on May 10, 2012.
Don't Trust the B---- in Apartment 23—Picked up for a second season on May 11, 2012.
Grey's Anatomy—Picked up for a ninth season on May 10, 2012.
Happy Endings—Picked up for a third season on May 11, 2012.
Last Man Standing—Picked up for a second season on May 11, 2012.
The Middle—Picked up for a fourth season on May 10, 2012.
Modern Family—Picked up for a fourth season on May 10, 2012.
Once Upon a Time—Picked up for a second season on May 10, 2012.
Primetime—Announced on the 2012/13 schedule for a twenty-fourth season on May 15, 2012.
Private Practice—Picked up for a sixth and final season on May 11, 2012.
Revenge—Picked up for a second season on May 10, 2012.
Saturday Night Football—Announced on the 2012/13 schedule for a seventh season on May 15, 2012.
Scandal—Picked up for a second season on May 11, 2012.
Shark Tank—Picked up for a fourth season on May 10, 2012.
Suburgatory—Picked up for a second season on May 10, 2012.
Wife Swap—Picked up for an eighth season on May 11, 2012.

CBS
2 Broke Girls—Picked up for a second season on March 14, 2012.
48 Hours—Picked up for a twenty-fifth season on March 14, 2012.
60 Minutes—Picked up for a forty-fifth season on March 14, 2012.
The Amazing Race—Picked up for a twenty-first cycle on March 14, 2012.
The Big Bang Theory—Picked up for two additional seasons on January 12, 2011, running through its seventh season in 2013/14.
Blue Bloods—Picked up for a third season on March 14, 2012.
Criminal Minds—Picked up for an eighth season on March 14, 2012.
CSI: Crime Scene Investigation—Picked up for a thirteenth season on March 14, 2012.
CSI: NY—Picked up for a ninth season on May 13, 2012.
The Good Wife—Picked up for a fourth season on March 14, 2012.
Hawaii Five-0—Picked up for a third season on March 14, 2012.
How I Met Your Mother—Picked up for an eighth season on March 4, 2011.
The Mentalist—Picked up for a fifth season on March 14, 2012.
Mike & Molly—Picked up for a third season on March 14, 2012.
NCIS—Picked up for a tenth season on March 14, 2012.
NCIS: Los Angeles—Picked up for a fourth season on March 14, 2012.
Person of Interest—Picked up for a second season on March 14, 2012.
Rules of Engagement—Picked up for a seventh season on May 21, 2012.
Survivor—Picked up for two more cycles in the 2012/13 season on November 17, 2011.
Two and a Half Men—Picked up for a tenth season on May 12, 2012, which is fully recovered from the firing of star Charlie Sheen.
Undercover Boss—Picked up for a fourth season on March 14, 2012.
Unforgettable—Revived for a second season on June 29, 2012.

The CW
90210—Picked up for a fifth season on May 3, 2012.
America's Next Top Model—Picked up for a nineteenth cycle on February 21, 2012.
Gossip Girl—Picked up for a sixth and final season on May 11, 2012.
Hart of Dixie—Picked up for a second season on May 11, 2012.
Nikita—Picked up for a third season on May 11, 2012.
Supernatural—Picked up for an eighth season on May 3, 2012.
The Vampire Diaries—Picked up for a fourth season on May 3, 2012.

Fox
American Dad!—Picked up for a seventh production cycle on February 23, 2011.
American Idol—Announced on the 2012/13 schedule for a twelfth season on May 14, 2012.
Bob's Burgers—On October 31, 2011, Fox ordered 9 additional episodes to the second production cycle, leaving some episodes out, airing in the 2012/13 season.
Bones—Picked up for an eighth season on March 29, 2012.
The Cleveland Show—Picked up for a fourth season on May 9, 2011.
Family Guy—Picked up for an eleventh season on May 9, 2011.
Fringe—Picked up for a fifth and final season on April 26, 2012.
Glee—Picked up for a fourth season on April 9, 2012.
Kitchen Nightmares—Picked up for a fifth production cycle on February 2, 2012.
Mobbed—Announced on the 2012/13 schedule for more specials on May 14, 2012.
New Girl—Picked up for a second season on April 9, 2012.
Raising Hope—Picked up for a third season on April 9, 2012.
The Simpsons—Picked up for a twenty-third production cycle on November 11, 2010, plus an additional extension through its twenty-fifth production cycle in 2013/14.
Touch—Picked up for a second season on May 9, 2012.
The X Factor—Picked up for a second season on November 2, 2011.

Ion Television
Flashpoint—Picked up for a fifth season on January 3, 2012.

NBC
30 Rock—Picked up for a seventh and final season on May 10, 2012.
The Apprentice—Announced on the 2012/13 schedule for a thirteenth cycle on May 13, 2012.
Betty White's Off Their Rockers—Announced on the 2012/13 schedule for a second season on May 13, 2012.
The Biggest Loser—Announced on the 2012/13 schedule for a fourteenth cycle on May 13, 2012.
Community—Picked up for a fourth season on May 10, 2012.
Dateline NBC—Announced on the 2012/13 schedule for a twenty-second season on May 13, 2012.
Fashion Star—Picked up for a second season on May 11, 2012.
Football Night in America—On August 19, 2009, NBC announced they will extend NFL on NBC through 2013, plus an additional extension through 2022 on December 14, 2011.
Grimm—Picked up for a second season on March 16, 2012.
Law & Order: Special Victims Unit—Picked up for a fourteenth season on May 9, 2012.
NBC Sunday Night Football—On August 19, 2009, NBC announced they will extend NFL on NBC through 2013, plus an additional extension through 2022 on December 14, 2011.
The Office—Picked up for a ninth and final season on May 11, 2012.
Parenthood—Picked up for a fourth season on May 10, 2012.
Parks and Recreation—Picked up for a fifth season on May 11, 2012.
Rock Center with Brian Williams—Announced on the 2012/13 schedule for a second season on May 13, 2012.
Smash—Picked up for a second season on March 22, 2012.
Up All Night—Picked up for a second season on May 11, 2012.
The Voice—Announced on the 2012/13 schedule for a third season on May 13, 2012.
Whitney—Picked up for a second season on May 11, 2012.

Cancellations/Series endings

ABC
Bachelor Pad—It was announced on March 16, 2013 that would not pick for the fourth season.
Charlie's Angels—Canceled on October 14, 2011 after seven low rated episodes. The remaining episodes aired through November 10, 2011.
Cougar Town—It was announced on May 10, 2012 that TBS would carry future seasons of the series, ending its run on ABC.
Desperate Housewives—It was announced on August 5, 2011 that season eight would be the final season. The series concluded on May 13, 2012.
Extreme Makeover: Home Edition—Canceled as a regular series on December 15, 2011. The series finale aired on January 13, 2012. Moved to HGTV in 2020.
GCB—Canceled on May 11, 2012.
Man Up!—Canceled on December 8, 2011 after eight low rated episodes. The 5 remaining episodes were moved to ABC's online website.
Missing—Canceled on May 11, 2012.
Pan Am—Canceled on May 11, 2012.
The River—Canceled on May 11, 2012.
Work It—Canceled on January 13, 2012 due to low ratings, harsh reviews and controversy after airing only 2 episodes.
You Deserve It—Canceled on May 15, 2012.

CBS
CSI: Miami—Canceled on May 13, 2012 after ten seasons. The series was credited as a key player in the network's ratings rise. This is the first CSI series to be canceled.
A Gifted Man—Canceled on May 12, 2012.
How to Be a Gentleman—Canceled, cut back from 13 episodes to 9 episodes, and changed the airdate from Thursdays to Saturdays for the remaining episodes on October 7, 2011 after only 2 episodes airing. The series was later pulled from Saturdays on October 18, 2011 after only one episode airing on Saturday.
NYC 22—Canceled on May 13, 2012.
Rob—Canceled on May 13, 2012.

The CW
H8R—Canceled on October 6, 2011 after four low rated episodes.
One Tree Hill—It was announced on May 19, 2011 that season nine would be the final season. The series concluded on April 4, 2012.
Remodeled—Canceled on February 9, 2012 after four low rated episodes. The remaining episodes aired through between February 22; and the last two episodes were August 13 and 20, 2012.
Ringer—Canceled on May 11, 2012.
The Secret Circle—Canceled on May 11, 2012.

Fox
Alcatraz—Canceled on May 9, 2012.
Allen Gregory—Canceled on January 8, 2012.
Breaking In—Officially canceled on May 10, 2012.
The Finder—Canceled on May 9, 2012.
House—It was announced on February 8, 2012 that season eight would be the final season. The series concluded on May 21, 2012.
I Hate My Teenage Daughter—Canceled on May 10, 2012.
Napoleon Dynamite—Canceled on May 14, 2012.
Q'Viva! The Chosen—Canceled on May 14, 2012.
Terra Nova—Canceled on March 5, 2012, but being shopped to other networks.

NBC
Are You There, Chelsea?—Canceled on May 11, 2012.
Awake—Canceled on May 11, 2012.
Bent—Canceled on May 11, 2012.
Best Friends Forever—Canceled on May 11, 2012.
Chuck—It was announced on May 15, 2011 that season five would be the final season. The series concluded on January 27, 2012.
Escape Routes—Canceled on May 13, 2012.
Fear Factor—Canceled on May 13, 2012. Was revived for MTV in May 2017.
The Firm—Canceled on May 13, 2012.
Free Agents—Canceled on October 6, 2011 after four low rated episodes.
Harry's Law—Canceled on May 11, 2012 after two seasons.
The Playboy Club—Canceled on October 4, 2011 after three low rated episodes. This was the first cancellation of the season.
Prime Suspect—Canceled on January 5, 2012.
The Sing-Off—Canceled on May 13, 2012.  Uncanceled for a fourth season on March 14, 2013.
Who Do You Think You Are?—Canceled on May 13, 2012. Moved to TLC in July 2013. The series would be returning to NBC in 2020–21.
Who's Still Standing?—Canceled on May 13, 2012.

See also
2011–12 United States network television schedule (daytime)
2011–12 United States network television schedule (late night)

Top weekly ratings 
 Data sources: AC Nielsen, TV By The Numbers

Total Viewers

18–49 Viewers

Notes

References

United States primetime network television schedules
2011 in American television
2012 in American television